Dobra ( or Hunyaddobra) is a commune in Hunedoara County, Transylvania, Romania, close to the city of Deva. It is composed of thirteen villages: Abucea (Abucsa), Bujoru (Sztregonya), Dobra, Făgețel (Fazacsel), Lăpușnic (Lapusnyak), Mihăilești (Mihalesd), Panc (Pánk), Panc-Săliște (Pánkszelistye), Rădulești (Radulesd), Roșcani (Roskány), Stâncești (Sztancsesd), Stâncești-Ohaba (Sztancsesdohába) and Stretea (Sztrettye).

At the 2011 census, 97.8% of inhabitants were Romanians, 1.3% Roma and 0.7% Hungarians.

Stâncești village was part of the defunct Stâncești-Ohaba Commune until 1956, when it became independent. It then joined Lăpușnic in 1966 and Dobra in 1968. Its population was 172 in 1966, falling to 124 by 1992. During censuses taken in the period, over 98% of inhabitants declared themselves as Romanians.

References

Communes in Hunedoara County
Localities in Transylvania